Suicide in Ukraine is a common cause of unnatural death and a serious social issue. In 2009, Ukraine ranked 13th in the world by its total suicide per 100,000 people. Suicide is Ukraine's most common type of injury death. Suicide is a leading cause of death in the Ukrainian army (data for 2012; before the beginning of the Russia-Ukraine war).

Statistics

Suicide in Ukrainian army 
Suicide is a leading cause of death in Ukrainian Army causing 18% to 50% of all deaths. Long-lasting psychogenic disorders caused by difficulties with Army lifestyle, inability to adopt to the environment and the stress of life are the primary reasons of suicides.

Multicenter Study on Parasuicides did a 1-year monitoring of suicidal behavior among Ukrainian soldiers based on World Health Organization guidelines. The study revealed–
 Average age of suicide attempters was 19.9 years.
 65% of suicide attempts required hospital treatment, others needed outpatient examination.
 Frequent suicide attempt methods included–
 Hanging (54.5%)
 Cutting (27.3%)
 Jumping from high places (9.1%)
 Overdose of barbiturates or other sedative drugs (9.1%).

Notable Ukrainians who committed suicide 
 Oleksandr Kovalenko, professional footballer, committed suicide by jumping from his apartment
 Vasyl Yevseyev, footballer and coach, suicide by jumping
 Mykhailo Chechetov, politician, deputy head and chief whip of Party of Regions, suicide by jumping from his apartment

Suicide prevention 
The Ukrainian Government and different national and international organizations make individual attempts and initiatives to prevent suicides in Ukraine. Various associations provide help and suggestions to people who are trying to commit suicide.

See also

References 

Death in Ukraine